Benjamin Balázs (born 26 April 1990) is a Hungarian footballer who plays for Tiszakécske.

Career

Vitória
On 3 July 2014, Balázs was signed by the Portuguese Primeira Liga club, Vitória S.C. In an interview with Nemzeti Sport, Balázs admitted that Videoton FC manager José Gomes suggested the signing of him.

Tiszakécske
On 20 January 2022, Balázs signed with Tiszakécske.

Club statistics

Updated to games played as of 15 May 2021.

External links
Benjamin Balázs at HLSZ 

Benjamin Balázs at rakoczifc.hu

References

1990 births
Living people
People from Kaposvár
Hungarian footballers
Hungary under-21 international footballers
Association football midfielders
Kaposvári Rákóczi FC players
Vitória S.C. B players
FK Teplice players
Újpest FC players
MTK Budapest FC players
Tiszakécske FC footballers
Liga Portugal 2 players
Czech First League players
Nemzeti Bajnokság I players
Nemzeti Bajnokság II players
Hungarian expatriate footballers
Expatriate footballers in Portugal
Hungarian expatriate sportspeople in Portugal
Expatriate footballers in the Czech Republic
Hungarian expatriate sportspeople in the Czech Republic
Sportspeople from Somogy County